Leigh Anne Bingham Nash (born June 27, 1976) is an American singer and songwriter who was the lead vocalist for the Christian alternative rock band Sixpence None the Richer and was also a member of Fauxliage. Her debut solo album, Blue on Blue, was released on August 15, 2006, by the One Son/Nettwerk record labels. Nash has released two other solo albums in 2011 and 2015. Nash has two Grammy nominations: Best Pop Performance By A Duo Or Group With Vocal in 1999 and Best Rock Gospel Album in 1998.

Early life 
Nash was born Leigh Anne Bingham in New Braunfels, Texas. She started singing country music and learning old country songs on the guitar at the age of 12. She had several years' experience singing in local cafes with a band and performed regularly at a Texan country & western dance hall. She met guitarist and songwriter Matt Slocum at a church retreat in the early 1990s.

Career 
Leigh Nash and Matt Slocum formed Sixpence None the Richer (named for a line from the book Mere Christianity by the author C.S. Lewis) soon after and went on to record four full-length albums with the band. Their first album, released when she was age 17, was The Fatherless & the Widow. The album garnered critical acclaim and Slocum and Nash searched for new band members.

Joined by Tess Wiley, Dale Baker, and J.J. Plascencio, the new band recorded This Beautiful Mess, which won a Dove Award for Best Album. Wiley quit the band after their US tour and the band released the Tickets for a Prayer Wheel EP and then signed to the Squint Records label following the demise of R.E.X.

The band's eponymous album was released in 1997 and the single "Kiss Me" in 1999. In 1999 they received numerous Dove Awards, including Best Artist of the Year. The band was also nominated for a Grammy Award. A second single, a cover of the La's "There She Goes", also hit the Billboard Hot 100, followed by a third single, "I Can't Catch You".

In 2000, Nash sang the song "Need to Be Next to You" for the movie Bounce. Written by Diane Warren, it became Nash's first solo single.

After the departure of drummer Dale Baker and bass player J.J. Plascencio, Sixpence None the Richer released Divine Discontent in 2001. Two singles from that album, "Breathe Your Name" and a cover of Crowded House's 1986 hit single "Don't Dream It's Over", charted on the US Adult Top 40 at No. 18 and No. 9, respectively.

In 2003, the band appeared on an episode of the final season of the ABC sitcom Sabrina, The Teenage Witch.

In 2004, Sixpence None the Richer announced their break-up by letter from Matt Slocum to CCM Magazine. After that, the band released The Best of Sixpence None the Richer. Nash and her husband left their Nashville home of 10 years and moved to Los Angeles.

Nash released her first solo record, Blue on Blue, in August 2006 on One Son Records, Nash's own imprint label through Nettwerk Productions. The first single, "My Idea of Heaven", was released to U.S. radio the week of July 14, 2006, and the song "Ocean Size Love" was to be the second single, but it was a promo release only. She has also recorded a song "Mirrors and Smoke" with the band Jars of Clay on their album Good Monsters the same year. She also performed the song "A Place for Us" (written by Bryan Adams) with Tyler James for the 2007 Disney film Bridge to Terabithia.

In 2007, Nash began a new band, Fauxliage, with Canadian band Delerium, which released a self-titled album on August 14, 2007. Nash, Megan Thompson and Kate York also started a Christian band called Thompson, York & Nash. They worked on a few songs that have been put on MySpace. However, none of the songs posted on their MySpace page have been formally released.

In January 2008 Nash traveled to New Zealand for the annual Parachute Music Festival, where she performed acoustic covers of Sixpence None the Richer hits "Kiss Me " and "There She Goes". In late 2008, Nash toured with Delerium.

Nash has since rejoined Sixpence and worked on a new EP My Dear Machine EP, and the Christmas album The Dawn of Grace. Guitarist Tess Wiley returned to the band to support them on a European tour.

Nash joined Open Wings-Broken Strings tour in late 2009, along with Ed Kowalczyk of Live and Art Alexakis of Everclear. In 2011 she released a worship album entitled Hymns and Sacred Songs, and in August 2012, she released Lost in Transition, her sixth studio album with Sixpence None the Richer.

On September 18, 2015, Nash released her album: The State I'm In. She writes for BMG.

In 2018, Nash released a cover of the Pretenders' 1986 single "Don't Get Me Wrong". In an interview, Nash stated that new music will be coming soon and will be crowd-funded. On August 25, 2021, Nash announced The Tide, a six-song project, would be released September 24 and would feature collaborations with Vince Gill, Tanya Tucker, CeCe Winans, Ruby Amanfu, Raul Malo and Stephen Wilson Jr.

Inspiration 
Nash has two distinct poles of inspiration: her work with Sixpence in the Christian music sphere and her childhood fascination with older female country artists like Tanya Tucker, Loretta Lynn, and Patsy Cline.

"I started singing country music and learning old country songs on the guitar when I was 12. I was really, really shy but just had this desire to get on stage and started calling clubs myself to ask if I could come down and sing," says Nash, who grew up in the Texas Hill Country town of New Braunfels.

Before long, the adolescent Nash was singing Loretta Lynn and Tanya Tucker songs like "You Ain't Woman Enough to Take My Man" and "Texas When I Die" on alcohol-free, open mic Sunday nights, backed by a middle-aged band of town locals. Later in life her interest in pop acts like the Sundays, Innocence Mission, and the Cranberries provided more formative material for her songwriting and singing.

Personal life 
Nash is the younger of two sisters. She married PFR drummer Mark Nash in May 1996, whom she met while both bands were performing at the Cornerstone Festival in Illinois. They have one child (a son) together, who was born in 2004. The couple divorced in 2007. Nash married musician Stephen Wilson Jr in 2011.

Discography 

 Blue on Blue (2006)
 Fauxliage (collaboration with Delerium) (2007)
 Hymns and Sacred Songs (2011)
 The State I'm In (2015)
 The Tide (2021)

Other appearances

References

External links 

 

1976 births
Living people
21st-century American women singers
21st-century American singers
People from New Braunfels, Texas
People from Nashville, Tennessee
American women country singers
American country singer-songwriters
American women pop singers
American women rock singers
American pop rock singers
American performers of Christian music
Musicians from New Braunfels, Texas
Singer-songwriters from Texas
Singer-songwriters from Tennessee
Country musicians from Texas
Country musicians from Tennessee
New Braunfels High School alumni